KNC may refer to:

Kamerun National Congress
Kiss and cry, often abbreviated as KnC
Kurdish National Council
Intel Xeon Phi Knights Corner
Kamla Nehru College, Korba, a college in Korba, Chhattisgarh, India